This is a list of European literatures.

The literatures of Europe are compiled in many languages; among the most important of the modern written works are those in English, French, Spanish, Dutch, Polish, Portuguese, German, Italian, Modern Greek, Czech, Russian, Macedonian, the Scandinavian languages, Gaelic and Turkish.

Important classical and medieval European literary traditions are those in Latin, Ancient Greek, Old Bulgarian,  Macedonian, Old Norse, Medieval French and the Italian Tuscan dialect of the renaissance.

European literature in the Classical period

Ancient Greek literature

Latin literature

European literature in the Romance languages

Catalan literature

French literature

Galician literature

Italian literature

Portuguese literature

Romanian literature

Spanish literature

Literature in other Romance languages

European literature in the Germanic languages

Anglic literature

Dutch literature

Germanic literature

North Germanic literature

Literature in other Germanic languages

European literature in the Balto-Slavic languages

Belarusian literature

Czech and Slovak literatures

Polish literature

Russian literature

Ukrainian literature

Literature in other Balto-Slavic languages

European literature in the Celtic languages

European literature in the Finno-Ugric languages

European literature in the Turkic languages

European literature in other languages

See also
Western literature
Medieval literature
Renaissance literature
Old English literature
British literature
Welsh literature in English
Scottish literature
Irish literature
Francophone literature
Cypriot literature
Nordic literature
Galician-Portuguese lyric
Ottoman poetry
Arabic literature in Al-Andalus
MLN: Modern Language Notes
 African literature
 Asian literature
 Oceanic literature
 Latin American literature
 Esperanto literature